Eleutherodactylus orcutti is a species of frog in the family Eleutherodactylidae endemic to Jamaica. Its natural habitats are subtropical or tropical moist lowland forest and rivers.
It is threatened by habitat loss.

References

orcutti
Endemic fauna of Jamaica
Amphibians of Jamaica
Amphibians described in 1928
Taxonomy articles created by Polbot